American R&B singer H.E.R. has released one studio album, two compilation albums, five extended plays, twenty-three singles (including ten as a featured artist) and thirteen promotional singles.

Albums

Studio albums

Compilation albums

EPs

Singles

As lead artist

As featured artist

Promotional singles

Other charted and certified songs

Guest appearances

Notes

References

Discographies of American artists
Rhythm and blues discographies